Lomemus sculpturatus  is a beetle species from the Elateridae (click beetle) family. The scientific name of the species was first published in 1893 by Broun.

References

Elateridae
Beetles described in 1893